Casa do Penedo (Portuguese for Stone House or House of the Rock) is an architectural monument located between Celorico de Basto and Fafe, in northern Portugal. It received its name because it was built from four large boulders that serve as the foundation, walls and ceiling of the house.

History
Its construction began in 1972 and lasted about two years until its completion in 1974.

The engineer who built the Casa do Penedo was from Guimarães. The residence was initially used by the owners as a holiday destination. Today Casa de Penedo is a small museum of relics and photographs from the house's history.

The building is located near a wind farm, although there is no electricity supply to the house itself. Due to its unusual design and integration into the surrounding nature, the building has become a growing tourist attraction.

References 

Houses completed in 1974
Buildings and structures in Fafe
Tourist attractions in Braga District
Houses in Portugal
Stone houses
Visionary environments